Neugartheim-Ittlenheim is a commune in the Bas-Rhin department in Grand Est in north-eastern France. The commune was formed in 1973 by the merger of the former communes Ittlenheim and Neugartheim.

On the top of the Kochersberg stood a castle built in the 13th century. It was destroyed in 1592 and only traces remain.

On its place was built between 1794 and 1797 a semaphore tower, the second nearest station from Strasbourg (after Dingsheim's one) on the semaphore line to Paris. It was used until 1852.

Since the late 20th century, a memorial replaced this tower. Consisting of a motionless reproduction of the arms of such a tower, it can still be seen (within clear weather) from over ten kilometres, making the Kochersberg hill easily recognizable.

See also
 Communes of the Bas-Rhin department

References

Communes of Bas-Rhin
Bas-Rhin communes articles needing translation from French Wikipedia